M29 is a Ukrainian international highway (M-highway) in eastern Ukraine that runs from Kharkiv to Dnipro parallel to the M18. It is also known as Kharkiv – Dnipro motorway, although it does not have an official motorway designation. The entire route is part of European route E105.

Main route
Main route and connections to/intersections with other highways in Ukraine.

 -

Gallery

See also

 Roads in Ukraine
 Ukraine Highways
 International E-road network
 Pan-European corridors

References

Sources
  
  
  

Roads in Dnipropetrovsk Oblast
Roads in Kharkiv Oblast